Father Sergius (Russian: Отец Сергий, translit. Otets Sergiy) is a 1918 Soviet Russian silent film directed by Yakov Protazanov and Alexandre Volkoff. It is based on the 1911 posthumously published story of the same name by Leo Tolstoy.

This was the first film version of the story, as the depiction of priests was not permitted in the film industry of the Russian Empire until after the October Revolution in 1917. Ivan Mosjoukine plays the title role. 

Father Sergius was screened in the United Kingdom in 1920 and 1927.

Plot summary
During the reign of Russian Tsar Nicholas I, Prince Kasatsky discovers that his fiancée has an affair with the Tsar. He decides to break his engagement and retires to a convent where he tries to reach holiness.

Reception
A review in The Bioscope, from the time of the film's screening in the United Kingdom in 1920, was critical of the technical qualities of the film, but commented on Moskoujine's "remarkable emotional acting", stating that the film's "emotional power and sincerity will be recognised by every spectator".

Cast
Ivan Mosjoukine as Prince Kasatsky, later Father Sergius
Olga Kondorova as Countess Korotkova
V. Dzheneyeva as Maria - her daughter
Vladimir Gajdarov as Tsar Nicholas I
Nikolai Panov as Kasatsky's father
Natalya Lisenko as Widow of the merchant Makovkin
Iona Talanov as Merchant
Vera Orlova as Merchant's daughter
Pyotr Baksheyev	
Polikarp Pavlov	
Nicolas Rimsky

References

External links

Russian silent feature films
Russian black-and-white films
Films set in the 19th century
Films set in the Russian Empire
Films of the Russian Empire
Films based on works by Leo Tolstoy
Films directed by Yakov Protazanov
Films directed by Alexandre Volkoff
Articles containing video clips
Soviet silent feature films
Soviet black-and-white films
Films about Orthodoxy
Cultural depictions of Nicholas I of Russia
Films about infidelity
1910s Russian-language films